The Moračani are one of the historical tribes of Montenegro and one of the seven highlander tribes from the Brda region. According to folklore, their founder was Bogić Moračanin (16th century), hence they also call themselves Bogićevci. The region that they occupy is called Morača.

Geography
To the east is the tribe of Vasojevići, to the south the Piperi and Bratonožići, to the west the Rovčani, to the northwest the Uskoci and north the Šaranci.

Notable people
Gavrilo Dožić
Mihailo Dožić
Sekula Drljević 
Amfilohije Radović
Andrija Mandić
Miodrag Perović
Andrija Milošević
Vojin Ćetković
Danijel Furtula
Igor Rakočević

References

Sources

Tribes of Montenegro
Kolašin Municipality
Mojkovac Municipality